Ibson Pereira de Melo (born 8 October 1989) is a Brazilian professional footballer who plays for Khon Kaen United as forward.

Football career
On 28 June 2017, Ibson signed a two-years-contract with Marítimo

References

External links
 

1989 births
Living people
Brazilian footballers
Ethnikos Achna FC players
Ayia Napa FC players
Pafos FC players
Ermis Aradippou FC players
C.S. Marítimo players
Cypriot First Division players
Primeira Liga players
Brazilian expatriate footballers
Expatriate footballers in Cyprus
Expatriate footballers in Portugal
Brazilian expatriate sportspeople in Portugal
Association football forwards
Sportspeople from Recife